Kasti may refer to several places:

Estonia
 Kasti, Rapla County, a village in Rapla County, western Estonia
 Kasti, Saare County, a village in Saare County, western Estonia

India
 Kasti, Maharashtra, a village in Ahmadnagar District, Maharashtra
 Kasti, Rajasthan, a village in Jodhpur District, Rajasthan

See also
Casti (disambiguation)
Gasti, village in Iran